Hypomeces is a tropical genus of true weevil family.

List of selected species
This genus comprise more than 50 species
 Hypomeces atomarius
 Hypomeces auricephalus
 Hypomeces aurulentus
 Hypomeces bernieri
 Hypomeces cinctus
 Hypomeces confossus
 Hypomeces curtus
 Hypomeces denticollis
 Hypomeces dispar
 Hypomeces fabricii
 Hypomeces gossipi
 Hypomeces guttulatus
 Hypomeces impressicollis
 Hypomeces inflatus
 Hypomeces laniger
 Hypomeces lanuginosus
 Hypomeces lynceus
 Hypomeces marginellus
 Hypomeces modestus
 Hypomeces orientalis
 Hypomeces pauper
 Hypomeces peregrinus
 Hypomeces pollinosus
 Hypomeces pulverulentus
 Hypomeces pulviger
 Hypomeces rusticus
 Hypomeces sparsus
 Hypomeces squamosus
 Hypomeces suturalis
 Hypomeces tibialis
 Hypomeces timorensis
 Hypomeces unicolor
 Hypomeces villosus

References 

 Hypomeces genus at Gwannon.com

Entiminae
Curculionidae genera
Taxa named by Carl Johan Schönherr